Artedius lateralis, also known as the smoothhead sculpin or round-nosed sculpin, is a species of marine ray-finned fish belonging to the family Cottidae, the typical sculpins.  The species, commonly found in the intertidal zone and to depths of 43 feet, is native to the northern Pacific, from Russia and the Bering Sea to Baja California.  Growing to a length of 14 centimeters, it takes its name from the lack of scales on its head.

References

External links
 
 Smoothhead Sculpin (Artedius lateralis) at the Encyclopedia of Life

lateralis
Fish described in 1854
Fish of the Pacific Ocean
Taxa named by Charles Frédéric Girard